Andrzej Aleksander Włodarczyk (born November 25, 1944, in Poland), known as André Wlodarczyk, is a Polish-French linguist.

Biography 
André Wlodarczyk lived in Wroclaw, Teresin and Warsaw. In 1969, he settled in Paris. He has dual Polish-French citizenship.

He studied (1) Japanese Philology at Institut national des langues et civilisations orientales (INALCO) and at Université Denis Diderot - Paris 7 and (2) General Linguistics at Université René Descartes - Paris 5. These studies were crowned with a doctorate (doctorat de 3e cycle ) in 1977 and habilitation (doctorat d'État) in 1987 at the Japanese Language and Culture department of Université Denis Diderot (Paris 7).

From 1979 to 1992, Wlodarczyk worked as a researcher at the Centre National de la Recherche Scientifique – CNRS, and later as a professor at the following universities: Stendhal - Grenoble 3 (1992–2000) and Charles de Gaulle - Lille 3 (2000–2011). Moreover, in the years from 2000 to 2011, he supervised research in linguistics at CELTA (Centre for Theoretical and Applied Linguistics), Université Paris-Sorbonne (Paris 4).

Scientific activities

Structure of the Japanese language 
Wlodarczyk has edited seven volumes of Travaux de Linguistique Japonaise (L'Asiathèque) and a special issue of the quarterly "Langages" (Larousse, 1982) devoted to Japanese linguistics. 
Research themes:
 grammatical oppositions: morphological structure of the Japanese conjugation
 base components of utterances (Major Phrases)
 Meta-informative Centering (alternative theory of 'Information Structure')
 Japanese grammatical forms of politeness and the category of person.

Metainformation in language 
He is the author of a new linguistic theory disseminated under the acronym MIC (Meta-Informative Centering theory [6]). This theory has been proposed as a result of the generalization of research on the structure of Japanese utterances. Simultaneously – as an extension of the MIC theory - the foundations for a new theory of situation semantics (AS - Associative Semantics) for the description of natural languages have been laid as an original combination of semantics with pragmatics within the framework of general linguistics.

Interactive Linguistics 
Methodological studies [7] relate to the modeling of various phenomena using concepts and tools, and above all, to an interactive process consisting of four cyclical stages: abstraction, formalization, simplification and verification in the context of computer science. Interactive Linguistics is a research method involving the use of computer tools belonging to the field of Knowledge Discovery in Databases (KDD). A. Wlodarczyk is a co-author (with Georges Sauvet) of the computer platform SEMANA which brings together dozens of algorithms for symbolic and statistical computations.

Semiology of Prehistoric Rock Art 
Using computer analysis techniques for automatic data and knowledge retrieval (knowledge discovery in databases - KDD) Georges Sauvet and Wlodarczyk have proved the existence of concept systems (beliefs) in the artworks of prehistoric man. This tradition continued without significant changes until the end of the Ice Age, i.e. for more than 20.000 years, despite important changes in the tools (worked flint, bone and antler).

Publications 
 Politesse et Personne – le japonais face aux langues occidentales, préface de Claude Hagège, Paris: Éditions L’Harmattan, Paris 1996.
 Revue trimestrielle „Langages”, Éditions Larousse, 1982, nr 68:.
 Paris Lectures in Japanese Linguistics, Tokyo: Éditions Kurosio, 2005.
 La Focalisation dans les langues, seria Sémantiques, eds. André & Hélène Wlodarczyk, Paris: L’Harmattan, Paris, 2006.
 Japanese Linguistics – European Chapter, eds. Viktoria Eschbach-Szabo, Yoshihiko Ikegami & André Wlodarczyk, Tokyo: Éditions Kurosio, 2007. 
 Meta-informative Centering in Utterances – (Between Semantics and Pragmatics), eds. André Włodarczyk & Hélène Włodarczyk, John Benjamins Publishing Co., 2013.

Journals 
 Travaux de linguistique japonaise, Paris: Université de Diderot (Paris 7), 1977-1997 – 7 tomów (4-10):
 1977, IV, Recherches en syntaxe
 1978, V, Phonologie du japonais standard
 1982, VI, Syntaxe et sémantique Dialectologie
 1984, VII, Énonciation et sens – Etudes contrastives – Linguistique et poétique
 1986, VIII, Actes du 4e colloque d’études japonaises
 1991, IX, Description systématique de la grammaire Japonaise – Grammaire de Mizutani Shizuo
 1997, X, Langue – Ordinateur – Mentalité (réd. Toshio Ishiwata & ANdré Włodarczyk)

References 
 WLODARCZYK André, 1980,「主題から主語へ、そして主語から主題へ」、 言語 、Vol. 9,  No 8/80 、大修館
 – 1982, Entre le thème et le sujet - 'wa'  et 'ga', Travaux de linguistique japonaise, Vol. VI, Université de Paris VII, Paris.
 — 2003a, Les Homotopies du topique et du focus, Ordre et distinction dans la langue et le discours, Actes du colloque international de Metz (1999, publiés par Combettes B., Schnedecker C. & Theissen A., Honoré Champion Éditeur, Paris, p. 513-526.
 – 2003b, Les Cadres des situations sémantiques, Études Cognitives – Studia Kognitywne 5, Warszawa 2003, p. 35–51).
 – 2005, From Japanese to General Linguistics - starting with the ‘wa’ and ‘ga’ particles, Paris Lectures on Japanese Linguistics, ed. by Wlodarczyk André, Kurosio Shuppan, Tokyo
 – 2008 Roles and Anchors of Semantic Situations, Études cognitives / Studia kognitywne 8, SOW, PAN, Warsaw
 WŁODARCZYK André & WŁODARCZYK Hélène, 2006a, Focus in the Meta-informative Centering Theory, La Focalisation dans les langues, eds André Wlodarczyk & Hélène Wlodarczyk, L’Harmattan, Paris.
 — 2006b, Subject in the Meta-informative Centering Theory, Etudes cognitives / Studia kognitywne VII, SOW, PAN, Warszawa.
 — 2008, Roles, Anchors and Other Things we Talk About: Associative Semantics and Meta-Informative Centering Theory, Intercultural Pragmatics, Vol. 5. No. 3., Berlin/New York: Mouton de Gruyters.
 – 2013, Meta-informative Centering in Utterances – (Between Semantics and Pragmatics) Meta-informative Centering in Utterances – (Between Semantics and Pragmatics), eds. André Włodarczyk & Hélène Włodarczyk, John Benjamins Publishing Co., 2013.
 WLODARCZYK André & STACEWICZ Paweł 2010  Modeling in the Context of Computer Science - a Methodological Approach, Journal Studies in Logic, Grammar and Rhetoric, "Philosophical Trends in the 17th Century from the Modern Perspective", ed. by Halina Święczkowska, vol. 20 (33), 2010, a print and electronic journal

References

External links 
 Research Gate Research Gate
 Polish Science (Nauka Polska - OPI)
 Źródła krytyczne o poezji A. Włodarczyka – wywiady
 Sources critiques à propos de la Poésie d'Andrzej Włodarczyk – entretiens
 Travaux de Linguistique Japonaise
 John Benjamins e-Platform

1944 births
Living people
Linguists from France
Linguists from Poland
Semanticists
French Japanologists